Jamie Waite (born 20 February 1986) is a Thai-British retired professional football goalkeeper who last played for Lowestoft Town. He has represented Thailand at full international level.

Career
Born in Plymouth, Devon, Waite later moved to Coddenham, Suffolk. Waite represented Ipswich Town, Colchester United, Fulham and Ipswich Wanderers at youth level, appearing in and around the first team for the latter. Waite, the son of a British father and Thai mother, began his career as a junior in Thailand and made his debut for the national side aged just 15 years and 354 days when he came on as a second-half substitute in a game against Singapore in Bangkok.

His form for the Thai national team attracted the attention of Rotherham United with who Waite started a three-year scholarship in 2003. He left Rotherham after just one year and subsequently played for a number of clubs, including Braintree Town, Leyton and Woking, before joining Kettering Town, and then moving on to Barrow in January 2005.

He left Barrow to join Stevenage Borough in March 2005. He joined Cambridge United in August 2005, joining Chelmsford City on loan in September 2005 and moving to AFC Sudbury in January 2006.

Waite joined Milton Keynes Dons in July 2006. He was unable to break into the Dons first team and was released in January 2007. During his time at Milton Keynes found a cancer of the lymph glands and underwent a 10-month chemotherapy programme before being given the all-clear.

In August 2007, Waite signed on non-contract terms for Conference South side St Albans City, before moving to Bradford City on 21 November 2007 and playing in a reserve game on the same day against Hartlepool United. In March 2008 he joined Conference National side Droylsden on a loan deal. On 29 April 2008, Waite was deemed to be surplus to requirements at Valley Parade and was released by manager Stuart McCall along with 13 other Bradford players. He never featured for Bradford.

On 2 September 2008, he signed for Doncaster Rovers on a non-contract basis following a trial at the club. He was recommended to Doncaster by ex-player Barry Richardson after Waite was trained by him at Nottingham Forest. After less than a month with Rovers, he was released after failing to win a permanent contract. He signed for Harlow Town in the summer of 2009, and left the club later that year.

He joined Lowestoft Town ahead of the 2016–17 season.

References

External links

1986 births
Living people
English people of Thai descent
British Asian footballers
Jamie Waite
Jamie Waite
English footballers
Jamie Waite
Ipswich Wanderers F.C. players
Barrow A.F.C. players
Kettering Town F.C. players
Stevenage F.C. players
Woking F.C. players
Rotherham United F.C. players
Cambridge United F.C. players
Chelmsford City F.C. players
A.F.C. Sudbury players
Milton Keynes Dons F.C. players
St Albans City F.C. players
Bradford City A.F.C. players
Droylsden F.C. players
Doncaster Rovers F.C. players
Lowestoft Town F.C. players
Leyton F.C. players
Dagenham & Redbridge F.C. players
Association football goalkeepers